The Care For Wild Rhino Sanctuary is the largest rhino sanctuary in the world, spanning 28 000 ha in the greater Barberton Nature Reserve in Mpumalanga, South Africa. The exact location of the sanctuary is not disclosed due to security reasons. Opened in 2001 by its founder Petronel Nieuwoudt, it was started with the purpose of providing care and rehabilitation to a wide range of animals, namely the critically endangered Black Rhinoceros and White Rhinoceros whose numbers continue to decline due to rhino poaching.

Other than rhinoceros, the sanctuary is home to Lion, Nyala, Duiker, Owl, Hippo and others.

Care For Wild Rhino Sanctuary rescues orphaned rhinos mainly from the Kruger National Park which is still largely affected by rhino poaching. They also rescue orphan rhinos from the neighboring game reserves in the Mpumalanga and Limpopo region.

The Care For Wild Rhino Sanctuary is a Non Profit organisation

Mission 

 Rescue orphaned or injured rhinos from the wild
 Rehabilitate the rhinos to full health
 Release the rhinos into their natural habitat

Sponsors & Donors 

In September 2016 Investec Rhino Lifeline and Care For Wild Rhino Sanctuary formed a partnership
 In 2015 Konica Minolta South Africa adopted 7 rhino orphans at the Care For Wild Rhino Sanctuary.
 Pepperl+Fuchs adopted "Oz", one of the orphans at the sanctuary
 ER24 pledged to support the Care For Wild Rhino sanctuary by supplying crucial medical supplies and other much needed equipment

References

External Links
 Official Website

National parks of South Africa